Inka Bach (born 27 April 1956 in East Berlin) is a German writer.

She moved with her family to West Berlin in 1972 and after her Abitur in 1974, she studied philosophy and literature at the Free University of Berlin, where she also received an M.S. and a Ph.D. She has worked as a scriptwriter and she currently lives with her two children in Berlin.

Works 
 Deutsche Psalmendichtung vom 16. bis zum 20. Jahrhundert, Berlin [u.a.] 1989 (with Helmut Galle; Diss. FU Berlin 1987/1988)
 Hesel, Berlin 1992 (with Holzschnitten von Karl Schäfer)
 Pansfüße Berlin 1994 (with Holzschnitten von Karl Schäfer)
 Der Schwester Schatten Berlin 1998
 Hesel  Berlin 1998
 Wir kennen die Fremde nicht Rheinsberger Tagebuch, Berlin 2000
 Wer zählt die Opfer, nennt die Namen Berlin 2002 (with Regine Ahrem)
 Bachstelze, Erfurt 2003
 Glücksmarie, Berlin 2004
 Kanzlerinnen, schwindelfrei über Berlin, hrsg. von Corinna Waffender, Berlin 2005
 Der gemeinsame Weg, Berlin 2008
 Der Schwester Schatten. Eine Szenerie nach Trakl, Berlin 2010
 Aufzeichnungen aus dem Untergrund nach Dostojewskij, 2011
 "Schönes Wochenende", Berlin 2012 (with Ingrun Aran)

External links 
 
  bundesrepublik
  Info
  Info
  Info

1956 births
Living people
People from East Berlin
Writers from Berlin
German women writers
20th-century German women